C. Krishnan was an Indian politician and former Member of the Legislative Assembly. He was elected to the Tamil Nadu legislative assembly as an Anna Dravida Munnetra Kazhagam candidate from Kanyakumari constituency in Kanyakumari district in 1977 election.

References 

People from Kanyakumari district
All India Anna Dravida Munnetra Kazhagam politicians
Year of birth missing
Year of death missing
Members of the Tamil Nadu Legislative Assembly